Liga Futebol Amadora Terceira Divisão (often referred to as the LFA Terceira Divisão) is the third division of the Liga Futebol Amadora.

History
The Liga Futebol Amadora Terceira Divisão started from the 2019 LFA Terceira.

Clubs that participated in the 2019 season

The following 11 clubs competed in the 2019 Liga Futebol Amadora Terceira Divisão, as Emmanuel FC and AS Marca were finally promoted to Liga Futebol Amadora Segunda Divisão.

Emmanuel FC
AC Mamura
AS Inur Transforma
Karau Fuik FC
AD Maubisse
Laleia United FC
AS Marca FC
YMCA FC
AS Lero
Kuda Ulun FC
ADR União

References

External links
Official website

 
3
Sports leagues established in 2015
2015 establishments in East Timor